Fărăgău (Hungarian: Faragó, Hungarian pronunciation: , German: Hölzeldorf) is a commune in Mureș County, Transylvania, Romania. It is composed of six villages: Fărăgău, Fânațe (Fönácé), Hodaia (Telekytanya), Onuca (Unoka), Poarta (Körtekapu, German Birnthor) and Tonciu (Tancs, German Tesch).

Demography

See also
List of Hungarian exonyms (Mureș County)

References

Communes in Mureș County
Localities in Transylvania